Unik FK is a Swedish professional football club based in Uppsala. The bandy club and the football club Unik are now legally separate, but allied and share logo, colours, history and fan base.

Background
Uppsala-Näs Idrottsklubb was founded at Södergård on a summer day in 1947 and served the area just south of Uppsala town. These days the catchment has moved a bit and is now within the city limits, the club being based at Valsätra IP and serves the Gottsunda, Valsätra and the Norby areas. The club is now known in its abbreviated form as Unik, with football section as Unik Fotbollklubb and the bandy section as Unik BK. Unik FK run men's senior and junior teams and is supported by a thriving youth section including a football school for 6–7 year old.

Since their foundation Unik FK has participated mainly in the middle and lower divisions of the Swedish football league system.  The first team currently plays in Division 4 Uppland in the sixth tier of the Swedish football pyramid. They play their home matches at the Valsätra IP in Uppsala.

Unik FK are affiliated to Upplands Fotbollförbund.

Recent history
In recent seasons Unik FK have competed in the following divisions:

2013 – Division III, Norra Svealand
2012 – Division III, Norra Svealand
2011 – Division III, Norra Svealand
2010 – Division IV, Uppland
2009 – Division V, Uppland Södra
2008 – Division VI, Uppland Västra
2007 – Division VI, Uppland Västra
2006 – Division VI, Uppland Södra
2005 – Division VI, Uppland Västra
2004 – Division VI, Uppland Västra
2003 – Division VI, Uppland Östra
2002 – Division V, Uppland Östra
2001 – Division V, Uppland Västra
2000 – Division V, Uppland Västra
1999 – Division V, Uppland Södra

Attendances

In recent seasons Unik FK have had the following average attendances:

Footnotes

External links
 Unik FK – Official website

Sport in Uppsala County
Football clubs in Uppsala County
Association football clubs established in 1947
1947 establishments in Sweden